Sunrise at Campobello is a 1960 Warner Bros. biographical film telling the story of the struggles of future President of the United States Franklin Delano Roosevelt and his family when Roosevelt was stricken with paralysis at the age of 39 in August 1921. Based on Dore Schary's 1958 Tony Award-winning Broadway play of the same name, the film was directed by Vincent J. Donehue and stars Ralph Bellamy, Greer Garson, Hume Cronyn and Jean Hagen.

The film was produced with the cooperation of the Roosevelt family. Eleanor Roosevelt was present on the set during location shooting at the Roosevelt estate in Hyde Park, New York.

Plot

At the Roosevelt family's summer home on Campobello Island, New Brunswick, Canada (on the border with Maine) in the summer of 1921, Franklin D. Roosevelt is vigorously athletic, enjoying games with his children and sailing his boat.

Roosevelt is suddenly stricken with fever and then paralysis. Conflict ensues between the bedridden Roosevelt, his wife Eleanor, his mother Sara and his close political adviser Louis Howe. Later, as Roosevelt drags himself up the stairs, he painfully strives to overcome his physical limitations and resist remaining an invalid.

Roosevelt reenters public life as he walks to the speaker's rostrum at a party convention, aided by heavy leg braces and crutches.

Cast

 Ralph Bellamy as Franklin Delano Roosevelt
 Greer Garson as Eleanor Roosevelt
 Hume Cronyn as Louis Howe
 Jean Hagen as Marguerite "Missy" LeHand
 Ann Shoemaker as Sara Roosevelt
 Alan Bunce as Governor Alfred E. Smith
 Tim Considine as James Roosevelt
 Zina Bethune as Anna Roosevelt
 Frank Ferguson as Dr. Bennett
 Pat Close as Elliott Roosevelt
 Robin Warga as Franklin Roosevelt Jr.
 Tom Carty as Johnny Roosevelt
 Lyle Talbot as Mr. Brimmer
 David White as Mr. Lassiter
 Walter Sande as Captain Skinner
 Herbert Anderson as Vincent Dailey

Director Dore Schary had originally considered Anthony Quayle for the role of Roosevelt until Schary's wife suggested Bellamy.

Production
Sunrise at Campobello presents events that took place over three years, from August 1921 to July 1924, culminating in Roosevelt's speech at the 1924 Democratic National Convention. Before and during Roosevelt's presidency, the extent of his disability was minimized. Sunrise at Campobello depicts the debilitating effects of his paralytic illness to a greater extent than had been previously disclosed by the media.

Exteriors were filmed at the Home of Franklin D. Roosevelt National Historic Site, the Roosevelt Campobello International Park on Campobello Island and the Roosevelts' former Manhattan residence. Interiors were shots on sets at Warner Bros. The Shrine Auditorium in Los Angeles was used to represent for Madison Square Garden for the 1924 convention.

The film was scored by Franz Waxman.

Reception
The film faced competition from Elmer Gantry, The World of Suzy Wong, The Apartment and Butterfield 8, films that all dealt with sex and that impacted the box-office performance of Sunrise at Campobello.

The film was entered into the 2nd Moscow International Film Festival. At its screening on July 19, 1961 at the Russia Theatre, the audience started to leave within minutes. More than 2,000 attendees departed before the end of the screening, possibly after realizing that the film did not depict the war years.

Variety wrote that the film "...loses none of its poignant and inspirational qualities." It called Bellamy "brilliant", and noted Garson's "deeply moving, multifaceted characterization."

In a contemporary review for The New York Times, critic Bosley Crowther called Sunrise at Campobello "a well-done, moving biographical film" and wrote: "Ralph Bellamy's performance of Mr. Roosevelt is every bit as strong, as full of feeling and characteristic gesture, as Mr. Bellamy made it on the stage. ... However, it must be mentioned that a tendency to overdo some of the famous Roosevelt expressions ... induces a bit of vexation, especially when they are shown in close-up, which glaringly discloses their forced and theatrical quality." Crowther also criticized Greer Garson's "singsong manner of speech" that sounded like a caricature of Eleanor Roosevelt's voice.

The Hollywood Reporter review concluded that "the play was an excellent job and has been improved upon."

More recently, Darragh O’Donoghue considers the film a hagiography but notes: "Hume Cronyn is the heart and soul of the film as Louis Howe, FDR’s right-hand man, an asthmatic whose relish for the 'real world' of compromised politics disgusts FDR’s patrician mother played with haughty relish by Ann Shoemaker."

Awards and honors
Greer Garson won the Golden Globe Award for Best Actress – Motion Picture Drama.

Academy Awards
Nominations
 Best Actress: Greer Garson
 Best Art Direction (Color): Art Direction: Edward Carrere; Set Decoration: George James Hopkins
 Best Costume Design (Color): Marjorie Best
 Best Sound: Warner Bros. Studio Sound Department, George Groves, sound director

See also
 List of American films of 1960
 Franklin D. Roosevelt's paralytic illness

References

External links

 
 
 
 
 Movie trailer

1960 films
1960s biographical drama films
American biographical drama films
Films scored by Franz Waxman
American films based on plays
Films featuring a Best Drama Actress Golden Globe-winning performance
Films about Franklin D. Roosevelt
Cultural depictions of Franklin D. Roosevelt
Cultural depictions of Eleanor Roosevelt
Films about presidents of the United States
Films set in New Brunswick
Films set in New York (state)
Films set in 1921
Films set in 1922
Films set in 1923
Films set in 1924
Medical-themed films
Warner Bros. films
1960 drama films
1960s English-language films
1960s American films